Gazimagomed Schamilovich Jalidov Gafurova (born 16 March 1995) is a Spanish boxer. He competed in the men's light heavyweight event at the 2020 Summer Olympics.

Born in Russia, he arrived in Spain in 2004.

Professional boxing record

References

External links
 
 
 

1995 births
Living people
Spanish male boxers
Olympic boxers of Spain
Boxers at the 2020 Summer Olympics
People from Khasavyurt
Russian refugees
Russian emigrants to Spain
Mediterranean Games bronze medalists for Spain
Mediterranean Games medalists in boxing
Competitors at the 2022 Mediterranean Games